Omiodes anastrepta is a moth of the family Crambidae. It is endemic to the Hawaiian islands of Oahu, Molokai and Hawaii. It was first cited as possibly extinct in 1994 by the U.S. Fish & Wildlife Service. It was listed as extinct by the Hawaiʻi Biological Survey in 2002, but was rediscovered in 2003.

The larvae feed on Carex wahuensis. They feed in the crown of their host plant, eating the younger leaves and spinning them together for a retreat where pupation takes place. Full-grown larvae are about 25 mm long and bright green.

The pupa is about 11 mm long and pale brownish. The pupal period lasts about 15 days.

External links

Rediscovery of five species of Omiodes Guenée (Lepidoptera: Crambidae) on Hawai'i Island

anastrepta
Endemic moths of Hawaii
Moths described in 1899